Trinity Christian School, founded in 1980, is a private Christian P-12 school located in Wanniassa in the Tuggeranong Valley of Canberra, ACT, Australia.

Facilities
The campus of Trinity Christian School consists of a mixture of brick and corrugated iron facade standalone buildings. In addition to classrooms the school's facilities include science labs, a number of computer rooms, a music and drama studio, a metal and woodwork workshop and a kitchen teaching space. Sporting facilities include two ovals, a large gymnasium hall and asphalt basketball/netball courts.

Principals

Enrolment and staff
Trinity Christian School has approximately 1150 students and is divided into three sections: Junior (K-5), Middle (6-8) and Senior (9-12). The staff includes 76 full-time teachers, and 32 part-time teachers.

Extracurricular activities
Extracurricular activities include a school band, ISCF, Duke of Edinburgh's Award Scheme, musical production, instrumental music program, dance festival and camps.

Mission trips
Each year students from the senior section of the school are given the opportunity to go on a mission trip.  Destinations have included Uganda (via South Africa), India, Morapoi Station, WA, Narromine, NSW and Wellington, NSW.

F1 in Schools
Students from Trinity have competed at several F1 in Schools competitions.  Team Goshawk won the amateur championship in Canberra in 2007 and took second place overall at the 2008 World Championship in Kuala Lumpur, Malaysia.  They were presented the coveted award for "Best Engineered Design".
In 2008 team Redline Racing won the national finals in Canberra.  They placed 2nd at the 2009 World Championships in London where they won the award for the fastest car.

Contact with the International Space Station
In 2010 students from Trinity made contact with the International Space Station as part of the Wireless Institute of Australia's 100th anniversary. Students had the opportunity to ask astronauts about life in space.

History
Shortly after its founding in 1980, Trinity was amongst three schools that were included in a proposal by the then Education minister, Wal Fife. The idea was that schools with falling enrolments should take in students from private schools.

Notable alumni
 Alistair Coe, former leader of the Canberra Liberals
 Lydia Williams, Indigenous Australian goalkeeper for the Matildas

See also 
 List of schools in the Australian Capital Territory

References

Educational institutions established in 1980
Nondenominational Christian schools in the Australian Capital Territory
Private primary schools in the Australian Capital Territory
Private secondary schools in the Australian Capital Territory
1980 establishments in Australia